Dypsis baronii is a species of palm tree in the family Arecaceae. It is otherwise known as "sugarcane palm" because of the scars on its trunks that resemble sugarcane.

Description 
Dyspis baronii  is multi-stemmed and evergreen, growing 2–8 m tall. The stems grow in clusters of 3 to 5, they are 12–22 cm in diameter [unbranched],with a crown of 4 to 8 leaves up to 170 cm long.

Uses 
Wild Dypsis baronii is harvested for its edible apical bud and for medicinal purposes. it is grown in Antananarivo and elsewhere as an ornamental.

Distribution 
It is native to the island of Madagascar.

References 

baronii
Endemic flora of Madagascar